"J'attends un navire", also known as "I Am Waiting for a Ship", is a song written in 1934 by Kurt Weill with lyrics by Jacques Deval. The song was written for the musical  but later became an unofficial anthem of the French Resistance.

Background 
The song was one of a number of musical numbers prepared by Weill for the stage adaptation of Deval's bestselling novel Marie Galante, about a French prostitute who becomes stranded in Panama and must work as a spy to earn enough money to return to France. Weill entered into the project enthusiastically, since he needed the work as a recent refugee from Nazi Germany, but the collaboration with Deval was contentious, with the two barely communicating. Nevertheless, after a year of writing, the play premiered at the Théâtre de Paris on 22 December 1934. Poorly received by audiences and critics, the play ran only three weeks, but the song took on a life of its own through sheet music sales and a popular recording by the show's star Florelle.

Musically, the song is part of the genre of chanson réaliste, a style of cabaret song written from the point of view of working class or otherwise abject women, popular in the first part of the 20th century in France. The lyrics are sung from the point-of-view of Marie, a prostitute, who is selling herself on the streets for two dollars ("Beautiful girl!/Beautiful French girl/Two dollars!/You will be pleased"). The singer goes on to say she is not waiting for a man, but for a ship to carry her away from her current life ("It is not you I'm waiting for./I wait for a ship/which will come and to drive it, this ship has the wind of my heart which sighs/the water of my tears will carry it").

Lyrics

Notable Versions
The song enjoyed a brief vogue in the 1930s, recorded by cabaret singers like Lys Gauty. It was translated into English by the theatre critic Michael Feingold for the 1972 Broadway revue Berlin to Broadway with Kurt Weill: A Musical Voyage.

In other media
The song was used as the theme for the Edie Adams variety television show, Here's Edie.
An instrumental version of the song was used as the theme for the ITV television series Wish Me Luck, about a trio of British spies.

See also
Marie Galante, 1934 film of Deval's play

References

1936 songs
Protest songs
French songs
French Resistance
Songs with music by Kurt Weill
Pop standards
Great Depression songs
Songs of the French Resistance